

Alternative names 
 WW domain binding protein 11 (WBP11)
 Npw38-binding protein (NpwBP)
 Splicing factor that Interacts with PQBP-1 and PP1 (SIPP1)
 SH3 domain binding Protein, 70 kDa (SNP70)

Function 

Studies suggest that Wbp11 plays a role in DNA/ RNA transcriptional or post-transcriptional events related to cell division.  Wbp11 is found in the nucleus but not the nucleoli of cells in interphase.  However it is distributed throughout the cytoplasm in dividing cells.  Immunoelectron-microscopy experiments suggest that relocation from a peri-nuclear to a cytoplasmic distribution, coinciding with the onset of mitosis in cell division. Other studies have shown that Wbp11 is a component of the spliceosome.  Also, that Wbp11 fragments block pre-mRNA splicing catalysis.

Protein interactions
Wbp11 is a polypeptide known to interact with other WW domain of proteins such as the nuclear protein Npw38 via two proline-rich regions. It associates with Npw38 (hence the name NpwBP) in the nuclei and with Poly(rG) and G-rich ssDNA. The 70kDa protein has also been found to interact with SH3 (Src homology domain 3) domains. The C-terminal proline-rich sequences of SNP70/NpwBP/Wbp11, which binds to the WW domain of Npw38 also fits with both classic type I and type II SH3 binding sequences, hence the name (SNP70).

Wbp11 was found to bind strongly to the tandem SH3 domains of p47phox and to the N-terminal SH3 domain of p47phox, and more weakly to the SH3 domains from c-src and p85α. p47phox.

Furthermore, it has been shown to interact with PP1(protein phosphotase 1), hence the name SIPP1. It has an inhibitory effect to PP1, with its inhibitory potency increasing upon phosphorylation with protein kinase CK1. The binding of Wbp11 with PP1 involves a RVXF (Arg-Val-Xaa-Phe) motif, which functions as a PP1- binding sequence in most interactors of PP1.

A number of other interactions have been indicated such as:
 Vimentin 
 Growth factor receptor-bound protein 2 (GRB2) 
 Genome polyprotein 
 Tyrosine-protein kinase Fyn 
 Pre-mRNA-processing factor 39 (PRP39) 
 TNF receptor-associated factor 4 (TRAF4) 
 Calcineurin B homologous protein 3 (TESC) 
 Probable ATP-dependent RNA helicase DDX17 
 CD2 antigen cytoplasmic tail-binding protein 2 (CD2BP2) 
 Poly(rC)-binding protein 1 (PCBP1)

References 

Protein families